Alfonso Coloma y Jasarte de Melo, (1555 – 20 April 1606) was a Spanish prelate and bishop, member of the House of Coloma.

Family 
He is a son of don Juan IV Coloma y Cardona, 1st Count of Elda and a brother of Carlos Coloma.
Like others in his family, be was knight of St. John of Jerusalem.

Career 
His career started in Sevilla, where he was canon magistral. He was member of the holy Office of the inquisition, and became a royal counselor. On 27 Sep 1599 he was appointed as bishop of Barcelona and ordained by Saint Juan de Ribera. In 1603 he became bishop of Cartagena until his death.

References

External links and additional sources
 (for Chronology of Bishops) 
 (for Chronology of Bishops) 

Coloma family
1555 births
Spanish bishops